Codon is a small genus of plants from South Africa in the family Codonaceae in the order Boraginales. The genus Codon comprises two species.

Codon was placed in the Hydrophyllaceae and Boraginaceae. Recent phylogenetic analysis place it as sister group to the Wellstediaceae and Boraginaceae s.str.

The species of the genus Codon are annual to perennial herbs. The whole plants are densely covered with strong mineralised, unicellular trichomes on cystolithic foot-cells. The plants are growing from strong taproots.

The flowers are tetracyclic and polymerous. The whorls are 10- to 20-merous with a high variability even within one plant individual. Most common are 12-merous flowers. The sepals are free. The petals are fused up to three quarter of their length. The bases of the filaments are fused with the base of the corolla. The fused parts of the filaments form septa. These septa form separate nectar chambers. The gynoecium is superior and consists of two carpels. The base of the gynoecium forms a lobed nectary disc. Each lobe is covered with nectarostomata and secretes nectar in the nectar chambers. The flowers are bell-shaped and white in C. royenii and saucer-shaped and yellow in C. schenckii.

The fruit is an apical-loculicidal capsule. Seeds are reticulately sculptured.

Species
Codon royenii L.
Codon schenckii Schinz

Gallery

References

Boraginaceae
Boraginaceae genera